Pargana or parganah, also spelt pergunnah during the time of the Sultanate period, Mughal times and British Raj, is a former administrative unit of the Indian subcontinent and each parganas may or may not be subdivided into pirs. Those revenue units are used primarily, but not exclusively, by the Muslim kingdoms. After independence the Parganas became equivalent to Block/ Tahsil and Pirs became Grampanchayat.

Parganas were introduced by the Delhi Sultanate. As a revenue unit, a pargana consists of several mouzas, which are the smallest revenue units, consisting of one or more villages and the surrounding countryside.

Under the reign of Sher Shah Suri, administration of parganas was strengthened by the addition of other officers, including a shiqdar (police chief), an amin or munsif (an arbitrator who assessed and collected revenue) and a karkun (record keeper).

Mughal era
In the 16th century the Mughal emperor Akbar organised the empire into subahs (roughly equivalent of state or province), which were further subdivided into sarkars (roughly the equivalent of districts), which were themselves organised into parganas (roughly the equivalent of district subdivisions such as tehsil). In the Mughal system, parganas served as the local administrative units of a sarkar. Individual parganas observed common customs regarding land rights and responsibilities, which were known as the pargana dastur, and each pargana had its own customs regarding rent, fees, wages, and weights and measures, known as the pargana nirikh.

Pargana consisted of several tarafs, which in their turn consisted of several villages plus some uninhabited mountain and forest land.

British Raj
As the British expanded into former Mughal provinces, starting with Bengal, they at first retained the pargana administration, but, under the Governorship of Charles Cornwallis, enacted the Permanent Settlement of 1793, which abolished the pargana system in favour of the zamindari system, in which zamindars were made the absolute owners of rural lands, and abolished the pargana dastur and pargana nirikh. British administration consisted of districts, which were divided into tehsils or taluks. Parganas remained important as a geographical term, persisting in land surveys, village identification and court decrees.

Post independence
The pargana system persisted in several princely states, including Tonk and Gwalior. Parganas disappeared almost completely after the independence of India and Pakistan in 1947, although the term lives on in place names, like the districts of North 24 Parganas and South 24 Parganas in India's West Bengal state.

See also
 List of parganas of Uttarakhand

Notes

References 
 Hunter, William Wilson, Sir, et al. (1908). Imperial Gazetteer of India, Volume 12. 1908–1931; Clarendon Press, Oxford.
 Markovits, Claude (ed.) (2004). A History of Modern India: 1480-1950. Anthem Press, London.

Medieval India
Economic history of India
Administrative divisions of India
Subdivisions of the Mughal Empire
Types of administrative division
Former subdivisions of Bangladesh
Former subdivisions of India
Bangladesh